Lorentz invariance follows from two independent postulates: the principle of relativity and the principle of constancy of the speed of light. Dropping the latter while keeping the former leads to a new invariance, known as Fock–Lorentz symmetry or the projective Lorentz transformation. The general study of such theories began with Fock, who was motivated by the search for the general symmetry group preserving relativity without assuming the constancy of c.

This invariance does not distinguish between inertial frames (and therefore satisfies the principle of relativity) but it allows for a varying speed of light in space, c; indeed it allows for a non-invariant c. According to Maxwell's equations, the speed of light satisfies
 
where ε0 and μ0 are the electric constant and the magnetic constant. If the speed of light depends upon the spacetime coordinates of the medium, say x, then
 
where  represents the vacuum as a variable medium.

See also
 Doubly special relativity
 Orders of magnitude (length)
 Planck scale
 Planck units
 Quantum gravity
 Planck epoch

References

Further reading
 
 
  40th Winter School on Theoretical Physics

Special relativity
Symmetry